Starship Troopers 2: Hero of the Federation is a 2004 American military science fiction horror television film directed by Phil Tippett and starring Richard Burgi, Lawrence Monoson, and Colleen Porch. It is a sequel to Starship Troopers (1997) and the second installment of the Starship Troopers franchise. The film premiered on Encore Action on April 24, 2004, and was released on DVD and VHS on June 1, 2004.
The film received generally negative reviews from critics, who criticized the shift from the first film's action to horror, as well as the lack of returning cast from the first film. It was followed by the direct-to-video sequel Starship Troopers 3: Marauder in 2008.

Plot

A squad of soldiers find themselves pinned down on a world overrun by Arachnids ("bugs"); even with their new laser gun technology and assistance from psychic soldiers, the bugs overrun them. General Jack Shepherd (Ed Lauter) makes a last stand with four of his best soldiers, allowing the majority of his surviving troops to escape - including Sergeant Dede Rake (Brenda Strong), psychic Lieutenant Pavlov Dill (Lawrence Monoson), Private Jill Sandee (Sandrine Holt), her lover Private Duff Horton (Jason-Shane Scott), Private Billie Otter (Cy Carter) and Private Lei Sahara (Colleen Porch). Despite reaching relative safety, the team is whittled down by deadly storms and arachnid ambushes. Lieutenant Dill is plagued by visions of the Arachnids annihilating humanity, hindering his efforts to lead the team, and he takes his anger out on Private Sahara, who is revealed to be a psychic that lost reliable control of her abilities during puberty.

The survivors take shelter at Hotel Delta 1-8-5 - an abandoned structure containing the disgraced Captain V. J. Dax (Richard Burgi), who killed his commanding officer and was sealed in a furnace as punishment. A deadly dust storm kicks up, leaving the survivors without communications or back-up for a lengthy period of time, and they protect themselves with an electric pulse fence. Dax assumes command from Dill after deeming him an incompetent leader, leaving Dill aggravated as he sees Dax as a traitor to the Federation.

Soon after defenses are set up, the survivors are surprised to be met by a still-living General Shepherd, accompanied by three soldiers who rescued him from his group's slaughter - the comatose private Charlie Soda (Kelly Carlson), the strange-acting technical sergeant Ari Peck (J. P. Manoux), and the medic corporal Joe Griff (Ed Quinn). With the help of the newcomers they solve their technical issues, including lack of communication, and wait for a Fleet dropship to rescue them.

At the base, Soda showers and seduces Horton. Heartbroken, Sandee finds a new significant other in Griff, causing tempers to flare; however, both Horton and Sandee soon act strangely, as do many other survivors. Sahara seems to have become ill, suffering nightmares and waking up vomiting; Later, she accidentally brushes Griff's hand and has a psychic vision. She goes to Rake for advice and Rake suggests that Sahara is pregnant, which can cause visions if either parent or child is psychic - as well as make girls temperamental and think that "they know it all". Eventually Sahara and Dax find themselves facing a new breed of Arachnid; a bug that infests the human body by entering through the mouth and propagating inside the brain. They go to Dill with the news and make amends with him - after which a guilt-ridden Dill confesses to the horiffic visions he suffered having driven his prior poor decisions, which has left Dill haunted by the many deaths under his command during the escape. Sahara tells Dill that she has been receiving parts of the vision as well, and Dill tells Sahara that an occasional side-effect of pregnancy can be a temporary return of the psychic abilities lost at puberty.

Soon after making amends, Dill finds General Shepard has also been seduced and infected by Soda with the mind-controlling bug. Dill attempts to capture Soda along with several infected soldiers to be dissected and studied but, as he rants about the horrors that await them, an infected Otter kills him with a knife that Dax had given him; the murder is blamed on Dax, his name having been inscribed on the knife prior, and he is detained.

After Dax is imprisoned, Rake is ambushed by the infected Horton and Otter, the latter pinning Rake down while the former infects her by forcing the control bug down her throat. Otter then attempts to infect Sahara, but is caught and takes multiple pipe shots to the head. Rake takes multiple adrenaline shots to hamper her control bug long enough to wound Sandee, kill Horton and save both Sahara and Dax; she then kills herself before the bug can take full control of her. Sahara uses her restored psychic abilities to read the mind of the Arachnid that infected Rake and discovers the bugs' plan - to use General Shepherd to infest High Command and sabotage the entire Federation from within, allowing the bugs to wipe out the human race just like in Sahara's vision. Sahara and Dax kill the rest of the infected troops, confronting the infected Shepherd on the roof just as the pulse fences fail. Shepherd is about to be rescued when Dax, dual-wielding rifles, kills him. Dax gets Sahara onto the ship, telling the bewildered crew that she holds information vital to the survival of the Federation, but refuses to get onto the ship himself saying "Murderers don't go home!" (referencing his past crimes) and dies in a blaze of glory while fending off the bugs.

One year later on Earth, Sahara - now discharged from the military - attends a recruiting seminar with her newborn infant son to speak about her experience, speaking of Dax's actions and crediting him for saving her life. Although Dax is labeled a Hero of the Federation, his death is shrouded in propaganda as the Federation replaces his actual final words with "Shed no tears for me, my glory lives forever!", hiding his disgraced past and using his end as a means of recruitment. As Sahara leaves, the recruiting officer thanks her for attending and also tells her to raise her son well, as "We need fresh meat for the grinder"; Sahara is visibly alarmed by the implications and flees the recruiting station, while the recruiter smiles callously.

Cast

Reception

Critical response
On Rotten Tomatoes the film has an approval rating of 33% based on 6 reviews. 
Andy Patrizio of IGN gave the film a "mediocre" rating, writing that "Movies like this are why direct-to-video has yet to earn any respectability and is viewed as the home for bad movies".

Accolades
The film won the award for Best DVD Release at the 31st Saturn Awards in 2005.

References

External links
 

2000s science fiction horror films
2004 films
2004 science fiction action films
2004 television films
2000s English-language films
American science fiction horror films
American science fiction war films
American space adventure films
Films about extraterrestrial life
Films set on fictional planets
Starship Troopers films
Siege films
Sony Pictures direct-to-video films
Television sequel films
TriStar Pictures films
2004 directorial debut films
Films directed by Phil Tippett
2000s American films